Slobodan Janković (born 29 August 1981) is a Serbian retired football goalkeeper and current goalkeeper coach of Napredak Kruševac.

Career

Coaching career
After retiring at the end of 2019, Janković was appointed goalkeeper coach of his last club, Napredak Kruševac in January 2020.

Honours
Mladost Lučani
Serbian First League: 2013–14
Napredak Kruševac
Serbian First League: 2015–16

References

External links
 

1981 births
Living people
Sportspeople from Valjevo
Association football goalkeepers
Serbian footballers
FK Budućnost Valjevo players
FK Bežanija players
FK BSK Borča players
FK Napredak Kruševac players
FK Mladost Lučani players
Serbian First League players
Serbian SuperLiga players